Shaleum Narval Logan (born 29 January 1988) is an English footballer who plays as a right-back for Cove Rangers.

He began his career in the Premier League with Manchester City and played on loan at Grimsby Town, Scunthorpe United, Stockport County and Tranmere Rovers before signing for League One side Brentford in 2011. He joined Aberdeen in 2014, initially on loan, and he made over 250 appearances for the club.

Career

Manchester City
Logan was a product of the Manchester City youth academy and signed a three-year contract in the summer of 2007. His elder brother, Carlos Logan, is also a former Manchester City trainee. He first came into prominence after impressing during the U18s run to the 2005–06 FA Youth Cup final. Logan made his first-team debut in the 2–1 League Cup second round victory over Bristol City in August 2007 and made a second appearance in the next round against Norwich City in September 2007. He made his Premier League debut for Manchester City in a 2–0 away defeat to Portsmouth on 14 February 2009, starting the game and playing the full 90 minutes. In September 2010, Logan was a surprise inclusion in Manchester City's 25-man Premier League squad, making him City's 11th Englishman and 12th home-grown player in the list. Logan was released at the end of the 2010–11 season, having made just three first team appearances.

Loan spells
Logan joined League Two club Grimsby Town on a one-month loan in October 2007, and scored a goal on his debut against Rochdale. On his return to Manchester City, he was immediately loaned out to Scunthorpe United, again for a month. Logan made his debut for the club in a 1–0 loss against Blackpool.

He joined Stockport County on a one-month loan in February 2008. After making seven league appearances for the club, Logan returned to Manchester City after being recalled by his parent club.

On 24 July 2009, Logan joined Tranmere Rovers on loan until the end of the season, after signing a new contract at Manchester City. On 8 August 2009, he made his debut for the club in a 2–0 loss against Yeovil Town. On 15 August 2009, Logan provided a double assist for John Welsh and Ian Thomas-Moore in a 4–2 win over Gillingham. Logan then established himself in the starting eleven but then injured his hernia, resulting in him being ruled out for most of the remainder of the season after undergoing an operation. Fortunately, Logan made his return in a 1–1 draw against Colchester United and featured in the last two matches. At the conclusion of the 2009–10 season, Logan would return to Manchester City after completing his loan spell at Tranmere.

In the summer of 2010 Logan went on trial at Doncaster Rovers and Sheffield United, playing in friendly matches. On 23 November 2010, Logan played as a trialist for Watford in a reserve team game against local rivals Luton Town.

Brentford
Logan joined Brentford on 23 June 2011, the League One side being managed by former Manchester City player Uwe Rösler. On his move to Brentford, there was a clause to automatically extend his contract for a further year if he played a certain number of games. On 6 August 2011, he scored on his debut for Brentford in a 2–0 win over Yeovil Town. Following a 2–1 win over Exeter City on 16 August 2011, Logan had to have a scan on his ankle despite wearing a protective boot. After the ankle scan, Logan was out for two months on the sidelines. On 12 October 2011, he returned to training. On 25 October 2011, Logan made his return from injury in a 1–0 loss against Stevenage. In a 1–0 loss against Charlton Athletic on 19 November 2011, Logan suffered a concussion after colliding with his own goalkeeper Richard Lee and was taken off on a stretcher. After the match, he was taken to Charing Cross Hospital for CT scans and observation. On 27 March 2012, Logan scored his second goal for the club in a 3–1 win over Preston North End. On 7 April 2012, he scored his third goal for the club and set up a goal for Sam Saunders in a 3–0 win over Bury. During the 2011–12 season, he made 32 appearances and scored four goals. At the end of the season, Logan signed a new contract.

In the 2012–13 season, Logan played 53 games in all competitions and signed a new 18-month contract in January 2013. Logan scored Brentford's first goal of the 2013–14 season in an opening day 1–1 draw with Port Vale. He made 12 appearances before being replaced at right back by Alan McCormack in October, following mistakes in losses against Leyton Orient and Rotherham United. Logan returned to the side seven weeks later, when he came on as a substitute for McCormack after 75 minutes of Brentford's 1–0 victory over Notts County on 30 November. It was not until 29 December that he made his next appearance, a second-half substitute cameo (once again replacing McCormack) in a 3–1 win over Milton Keynes Dons. It was Logan's first appearance under new manager Mark Warburton and he was assured of his Brentford future in talks with Warburton the following day. A reshuffle of the Brentford side led to Logan being awarded with a starting appearance against Port Vale on 11 January 2014. It was his first start since 12 October 2013 and he played the full 90 minutes of the 2–0 win. What would be Logan's final Brentford appearance came in a 3–1 victory over Bristol City at Griffin Park on 28 January. On 14 May, it was announced that Logan had been released by the Bees. He made 19 appearances and scored one goal during the 2013–14 season and left Griffin Park having made 104 appearances and scored five goals during his three seasons with the club.

Aberdeen (loan)
On 30 January 2014, Logan signed for Scottish Premiership side Aberdeen on loan until the end of the 2013–14 season, linking up with former teammates Willo Flood, Niall McGinn and Nicky Weaver. Upon the move, Logan stated that agreeing a deal allowing him to spend time with his family was an important factor in his move and that he was motivated to help the club win trophies. Logan made his debut against St Johnstone in the League Cup semi-final which Aberdeen won 4–0. He made his league debut, playing on the right of midfield, as Aberdeen won 1–0 against St Mirren On 16 March, Logan played the full 120 minutes of normal plus extra time in the Scottish League Cup Final against Inverness Caledonian Thistle which Aberdeen won 4–2 on penalty kicks. Logan then scored his first goal for the club on 3 May 2014, as Aberdeen lost 5–2 against Celtic. Logan's successful loan spell came to an end at the end of the campaign after making 18 appearances and scoring one goal.

During his loan spell at Aberdeen, Logan became a fan's favourite, saying the supporters treated him like David Beckham.

Aberdeen
After being released by Brentford, Logan signed a pre-contract permanent move with Aberdeen on a two-year contract on 27 May 2014.

Logan's first appearance after signing for the club on a permanent basis came against FK Daugava Riga in the first qualifying round of the Europa League, during which he scored the opening goal, in a 5–0 home victory. In the second leg, Logan then provided an assist for Adam Rooney, who went on to score a hat-trick, in a 3–0 win over to send them through to the next round. However, Aberdeen's Europa League run came to an end after losing 5–2 to Real Sociedad on aggregate, during the second leg Logan gave away the penalty which allowed Real Sociedad to equalise.

On 13 September, in a match against Celtic, he was racially abused by opponent Aleksandar Tonev, who was found guilty and given a seven-match ban. Contrary to what was published in the Daily Record there was no formal or sanctioned forgiveness. Logan scored his first league goal for Aberdeen on 27 September 2014, in a 3–2 win over Inverness Caledonian Thistle. On 10 November 2014, at full time of Aberdeen's 2–1 defeat to Celtic, Logan received a red card for using "offensive and insulting language", resulting in a one-match ban. During the season he went on to score goals against St Mirren and Ross County. With Aberdeen challenging at the top of the league, Logan stated his belief that the club could win the Scottish Premiership, He helped the club finish in second position, qualifying for a European place. Not only that, Logan was named in the PFA Scotland Premiership Team of the Year on 1 May 2015. In his first season at Aberdeen made 45 appearances and scoring four times in all competitions.

Ahead of the 2015–16 season, Logan was linked a move back to England, with Bolton Wanderers. In April 2016, he signed a new contract, keeping him at the club until summer 2018.

On 11 July 2017, Logan extended his contract with Aberdeen for a further two years, until 2020.

Logan was loaned to Heart of Midlothian in March 2021.

Cove Rangers
Logan left Aberdeen at the conclusion of the 2020/21 Scottish Premiership season, after his contract was not renewed by the club. On 27 July 2021 Logan joined Cove Rangers.

Personal life
Logan was made to dress up as Celtic captain Scott Brown on his stag do in March 2019, wearing a full strip with Brown's name and number.  Logan is training to be a plumber when his footballing career comes to an end.

Logan was arrested in Aberdeen on 17 June 2021 for money laundering. It is understood the charge relates to the Proceeds of Crime Act.

Logan is to appear in court accused of drink driving. He was arrested on suspicion of being over the limit. A Police Scotland spokesperson said: “We can confirm a 33-year-old man was arrested and charged in connection with a road traffic offence on the A944 in the Aberdeen area during the evening of 25 June 2021.

Career statistics

Honours
Aberdeen
Scottish League Cup: 2013–14
Runner-up 2016–17, 2018–19
Scottish Cup: Runner-up 2016–17

Heart of Midlothian
Scottish Championship: 2020–21

Cove Rangers
Scottish League One: 2021–22

References

External links

1988 births
Living people
People from Wythenshawe
English footballers
Association football defenders
Manchester City F.C. players
Grimsby Town F.C. players
Scunthorpe United F.C. players
Stockport County F.C. players
Tranmere Rovers F.C. players
Brentford F.C. players
Aberdeen F.C. players
Heart of Midlothian F.C. players
Cove Rangers F.C. players
English Football League players
Premier League players
Scottish Professional Football League players
Black British sportsmen
Footballers from Manchester